Vagif Soltan oglu Verdiyev also known as Vagif Sultanli (born March 26, 1958) is an Azerbaijani literary writer, critic, translator, member of Union of Azerbaijani Writers, Doctor of philological sciences (1997), professor (1999).

Biography 
Vagif Sultanli was born on March 26, 1958 in the village of Shakhsevan in Kurdamir.

He graduated from the village school of Kohnabazar in 1974. During his studies in high school, he also studied at the Kurdamir District Music School from 1970 to 1975. In 1974–1976 he worked at electricity network of Kurdamir region. He graduated from the Faculty of Philology of the Azerbaijan State University with honors in 1981.

He began his career as language and literature teacher in the village of Kaladzhyk, Ismayilli. Then he continued his postgraduate studies at the Department of Contemporary Azerbaijan Literature at Azerbaijan State University.

In 1984 he defended his thesis on "The Problem of Character in Azerbaijani Drama (1970-1980)". He worked as a teacher, senior lecturer and associate professor at Baku State University from 1984 to 1991. From 1999 he has worked at the Department of History of Azerbaijani Literature of the university. He defended his doctoral thesis on "The Life and Literary Activity of Mahammad Amin Rasulzade" in 1997. He has been consistently engaged in public activities. He founded the World Association of Azerbaijani Studies and was elected its chairman in 1991.

In 1995–1998 Vagif Sultanli worked as correspondent for literary broadcasts in the Azerbaijani editorial office of American radio stations Radio Free Europe/Radio Liberty (RFE/RL). He was the editor-in-chief of publications published in Poland ("Khudaferin" - 1995), Sweden ("Araz" - 1996-1997), and the United States ("World Azerbaijanis" - 2000-2012).

Vagif Sultanli is the head of the Caucasus Bureau of the Cyprus-Balkans-Eurasia Turkish Literature Organization (Turkey). He was awarded the H. Zardabi Award (1995), the International Turkish Language Service Award of the Cyprus-Balkans and Eurasia Turkish Literature Organization (KIBATEK) (2003) and the Honorary Decree of the Ministry of Culture of Egypt (2014).

He was elected a board member of the World Azerbaijanis Congress (WAC) at the conventions held in Sweden (2001), the Netherlands (2002), Germany (2004), Belgium (2008) and the United Kingdom (2010). He is a member of International Society for Epic Studies.

In 2018, he was elected a member of the International Writers Association, based in the United States.

He is married and has two children.

Literary creation 
He started literary activity in early ages; however, his first story titles “The fragrance of wormwood” was published in the “Azerbaijani woman” magazine in 1980. Since that time he regularly publishes own stories, translations and scientific-publisistic articles in mass-media.

In the narrative titled “The Dream of Death” (1982) deemed as one of the author’s noticeable works the transfer of cemetery is described as a serious chaos and anxiety in the social life. This chaos allows to discover the internal spiritual world of the described characters. In this narrative ending with suicide by the bulldozer driver having destroyed the cemetery the author pursues an object of identifying the contradiction of the spiritual and mortal values with death. 

The novel titled “The Human Sea” (1992) written in conjunction of the real and conditional-metaphoric styles has a special place in the author’s literary creation. In this novel the events of which happen in 80s of the last century the hero being rescued from the punishment of death and secretly living in alien city describes the issue of alienation being absorbed into the spirituality and morality of the society. 

The events described in the novel titled “Struggle in the Desert” (2010) differing with specific narrative style are expressed on the background of destiny of the hero which, due to the time’s breaking up rejects the future and womes towards the past. Development of the events on this platitude allows the author expressing own philosophic thoughts regarding the human being and the world. The novel “Struggle in desert” differs with spirit of protest against the issues of alienation, oblivion, mnegligence and unnecessity  ruling all over the world.

“The white way”, “The morning mist”, “The green song of leafless branches”, “The wanderer”, “The cave”, “Polar night”, “The Motherland”, “The Island”, “Mirage”, “Reverse flow”, “The silent ring”, “The ash cage”, “The striped burrow”, “The cross shadow”, “The clay mistery” and other stories by Vagif Sultanly differ with specific style and linguistic features. Historical stories like “The place of meeting”, “Navai-Gumru”, “Humayun”, etc. also belong to the author’s pen. He is also the author of many miniatures written in lyric-romantic style.

Scientific creation 
Besides the literary creation the author deals also with the theoretical-esthetical issues of art. His researches connected with the literary critics and literary science are expressed in his books titled “Mammad Amin Rasulzade’s literary world” (1993), “The traveler of a hard way” (1996), “The horizons of freedom” (1997), “Azerbaijani Emigration Literature” (1998), “The literary-theoretical illustrations” (2000), “The shore of survival” (2004), “The issues of studying the literary critics” (2007), “Literary criticism of Azerbaijan” (2012), “Love to Independence” (2014),  “Literary criticism of Azerbaijan” (2019), etc. The investigations connected to the Azerbaijani emigrational literature have a special place in the author’s activity of literary activity.
Vagif Sultanly is the author of numerous journalistic works and scientific articles connected to critics and literary process. His reports read in international conferences, workshops, forums and seminars are deemed as an important part of his scientific creation.

Translation activity 
Vagif Sultanly deals also with translation activity. He has translated into Azerbaijani language and published the novels “The Leaf Fall” and “The Mill” by Reşat Nuri Güntekin and the historical narrative “The Syracusian Scientist” by Sergey Jitomirsky as well as the stories by Erwin Strittmatter, Jaroslav Hasek, Veijo Meri, Gustav Stopka, etc. He has translated from Russian (jointly) the work titled “About Panturanism” by Mammad Amin Rasulzade.

The books 
 The stars out (narrative and stories) - 1988
 The Human Sea (novel)  - 1992
 Mammad Amin Rasulzade’s literary world (educational manual) - 1993
 The traveler of hard way (monograph) - 1996
 The horizons of freedom (collection of articles) -1997
 Azerbaijani Emigration Literature (educational manual) - 1998
 Slave market (stories, miniatures, essays) - 1999
 Literary-theoretical illustrations (theoretical fragments) - 2000
 The Dream of Death (novel, stories and essays) -2002
 The shore of survival (dialogue-monograph) - 2004
 The issues of studying of literary critics (educational manual) – 2007
 Literary criticism of Azerbaijan (educational manual) - 2009
 The valley of unnecessity (novel and stories) - 2010
 Literary criticism of Azerbaijan – Improved 2nd publication (educational manual) - 2012
 Love to Independence (monograph) - 2014
 Struggle in the Desert (novel) - 2015
 Literary criticism of Azerbaijan – Improved 2nd publication (educational manual) – 2019

The works published in the English language 
 The Human Sea (novel). Edited by Michael Brannock, Liverpool, Rossendale Books, 2012, 204 p.
 The Human Sea (novel). Bloomington, Trafford Publishing, 2012, 240 p.
 The Dream of Death (novel and short stories). Edited by Michael Brannock, London, Rossendale Books, 2013, 162 p.
 Reverse flow (novel and short stories). Edited by Michael Brannock, London, Rossendale Books, 2014, 182 p.
 The Dream of Death (novel and short stories). Edited by Annemarie Sjold, Helsinge, Whyte Tracks Publishing, 2014, 136 p.
 The Legend of the Snake (A novel and collection of short stories). Edited by Michael Brannock, London, Rossendale Books, 2015, 308 p.
 The Dream of Death (novel and short stories). II Edition, Edited by Annemarie Sjold and Tamara Dragadze, Helsinge, Whyte Tracks Publishing, 2015, 136 p.
 A Blind Tie. Selected Works, Raleigh, Rossendale Books, 2017, 400 p.
 Sruggle in the Desert. (novel), London, Rossendale Books, 2019, 196 p.

References

Azerbaijani philologists
Soviet Azerbaijani people
People from Kurdamir District
Baku State University alumni
1958 births
Living people